Ole Andreas Sæther (23 January 1870 – 13 October 1946) was a Norwegian rifle shooter who competed in the early 20th century. He won several Olympic medals.

References

External links
 

1870 births
1946 deaths
Norwegian male sport shooters
ISSF rifle shooters
Olympic gold medalists for Norway
Olympic silver medalists for Norway
Olympic bronze medalists for Norway
Olympic shooters of Norway
Shooters at the 1900 Summer Olympics
Shooters at the 1908 Summer Olympics
Shooters at the 1912 Summer Olympics
Olympic medalists in shooting
Medalists at the 1900 Summer Olympics
Medalists at the 1908 Summer Olympics
Medalists at the 1912 Summer Olympics
People from Steinkjer
Sportspeople from Trøndelag
20th-century Norwegian people